Megistocera is a genus of true crane fly.

Distribution
Angola, Argentina, Australia, Benin, Bolivia, Brazil, Congo, Cuba, Dominican Republic, Guinea, Guyana, Haiti, India, Indonesia, Jamaica, Madagascar, Malawi, Malaysia, Mozambique, Nigeria, Papua New Guinea, Paraguay, Peru, Philippines, Puerto Rico, Solomon Islands, South Africa, Suriname, Tanzania, Thailand, Trinidad, Uganda, US.

Species
M. filipes (Fabricius, 1805)
M. longipennis (Macquart, 1838)

References

Tipulidae
Diptera of Africa
Diptera of Asia
Diptera of Australasia
Diptera of North America